GDX may refer to:
 GDx-VCC, a medical diagnostic machine
 Godwari dialect
 libGDX, an open source Java game library
 Sokol Airport, in Magadan, Russia